John H. Frye (May 1864 - June 10, 1904) was an American baseball first baseman in the Negro leagues. Most of his uncovered records show he played for the Cuban Giants before 1900.

There he played with many of the top-tier players of his day, including Sol White, John Patterson, Frank Grant, William Jackson, and Robert Jordan.

References

External links
 and Seamheads

Cuban Giants players
Baseball players from Pennsylvania
1864 births
1904 deaths
Ansonia Cuban Giants players
20th-century African-American people
Baseball infielders